"All Too Soon" is a 1940 song composed by Duke Ellington with lyrics written by Carl Sigman. It is recorded in the key of C major. It was subsequently recorded by several contemporary and modern artists.

Notable recordings
Duke Ellington
recorded in 1940, available in compilation albums such as Never No Lament: The Blanton-Webster Band (2003)
recorded during 1953–1955
Unknown Session (recorded in 1960, released in 1979)
Ella and Duke at the Cote D'Azur (1966)
1969: All-Star White House Tribute (recorded in 1969, released in 2002)
Mildred Bailey - recorded on June 13, 1941 for Decca Records (No. 3888B).
Sarah Vaughan - recorded during 1944–1946, The Duke Ellington Songbook, Vol. 1 (1979)
Ella Fitzgerald - Ella Fitzgerald Sings the Duke Ellington Songbook (1958), Fitzgerald and Pass... Again (with Joe Pass, 1979)
Peggy Lee, George Shearing - Beauty and the Beat! (1959)
Chris Connor - A Portrait of Chris (1961)
Billy Byers – Impressions of Duke Ellington(1962)
Anita O'Day - Anita O'Day & The Three Sounds (1963)
Milt Jackson, Ray Brown, Mickey Roker, Joe Pass - All Too Soon: The Duke Ellington Album (1980)
Sathima Bea Benjamin - Musical Echoes (2002)
Jeri Southern - for her album Jeri Gently Jumps (1957)
Jane Monheit - The Songbook Sessions: Ella Fitzgerald (2016)

References 

Songs with music by Duke Ellington
1940s jazz standards
1940 songs
Songs written by Carl Sigman
Mildred Bailey songs